Glenvar is a census-designated place (CDP) in western Roanoke County, Virginia, United States. The population as of the 2010 Census was 976. The center of the community lies along US 11/US 460 about one mile west of the Salem city limits. The community is home to Glenvar High School which serves most of the western sections of Roanoke County.  As a result, the entire area of Roanoke County which is west of Salem and in the Roanoke Valley between Poor Mountain and Fort Lewis Mountain, including other communities such as Wabun, Fort Lewis, and Dixie Caverns, is often called Glenvar.

In January 2020 the Swedish truck maker Volvo announced that they would build an assembly plant for its subsidiary Mack trucks in Glenvar. The plant is expected to employ 250 people. This was reported by the Roanoke Times by Casey Fabris on 30 January 2020. However, the global pandemic of the coronavirus has halted production temporarily at all of Mack(Volvo) locations in Pennsylvania, Maryland, and Virginia.

References

Census-designated places in Roanoke County, Virginia